John Emerson Moss (April 13, 1915 – December 5, 1997) was an American politician of the Democratic Party, noted for his championing of the federal Freedom of Information Act (FOIA) through multiple sessions of the United States House of Representatives where he served from 1953 to 1978.

Biography
Moss was born in Hiawatha, Carbon County, Utah, in 1915, and moved with his family to Sacramento, California in 1923 where he attended public school and Sacramento Junior College. He held various sales, credit executive, and retail jobs from 1938 and 1943. In 1935 he married Jean Kueny, the daughter of Joseph and Winnefred (née West) Kueny of Galt, California.  Together they had two daughters, Jennifer Afton (dob 3/14/1946) and Allison Effie, (dob 10/17/1949).  In 1938 he joined the California Democratic State Central committee where he remained until 1980.  He died in San Francisco, California in 1997.

Moss served in the United States Navy during World War II and was elected to the California State Legislature in 1949, where he served as the Democratic floor leader until 1952.

U.S. House of Representatives
Moss served in the US House of Representatives for California's 3rd congressional district for 13 terms from 1953 until he retired in 1978.  He was nominated by both the Democratic and Republican parties in 1958 and ran unopposed in 1960. Moss earned the distinction of never being defeated in an election for public office.

Moss held the chair for the following subcommittees in the House of Representatives:
 Special Subcommittee on Government Information
 Foreign Operations and Government Information Subcommittee of the House Government Operations Committee
 Commerce and Finance and Oversight and Investigations Subcommittees of the Committee on Interstate and Foreign Commerce
 Oversight and Investigations Subcommittee, Committee on Interstate and Foreign Commerce

He also served on the following committees:
 Natural Resources Subcommittee on Water, Power and Oceans
 Subcommittee on Government Information and Individual Rights
 Subcommittee on Legislation and National Security
 Committees on Post Office and Civil Service and House Administration
 Joint Committee on Atomic Energy

Tenure

His legislative record includes:
 Freedom of Information Act (FOIA), which he authored and sponsored through several iterations
 Consumer Product Safety Act, which he authored and advocated
 Federal Trade Commission Improvements Act, also known as the Magnuson-Moss Act
 Deregulatory legislation to establish NASDAQ
 Consumer protection legislation, including protection against hazards related to automobiles,  toys, tires, flammability standards for children's clothing, and toxins.

Moss also played an active role in furthering legislative oversight, chairing hearings related to the World Uranium Cartel, FBI foreign security surveillance during the Vietnam War, abuse in federal contracting, GAAP, defensive medicine, pricing and supply of natural gas, passive restraint systems for passenger cars, regulation of pesticides, and amendments to the Foreign Corrupt Practices Act. Congressman Moss is considered the father of modern legislative oversight.

On May 1, 1973 Moss was also the first to call for the House to set up procedures for a bill of impeachment during the Watergate scandal.

Freedom of Information Act

Moss has been noted for his determination in passing the Freedom of Information Act into law. As chairman of the Government Information Subcommittee it took Moss 6 congressional sessions (over 12 years) to get the Freedom of Information Act through Congress successfully. Much of the desire for government transparency stemmed from the Department of Defense and Congressional committees evaluation of the nation's classification system in the late 1950s. They determined that the misuse of government classification of documents was causing insiders to leak documents that were marked "confidential". The Moss Committee took it upon itself to reform confidentiality policy and implement punishments for the overuse of classification by officials and departments. The landmark bill was signed into law by a reluctant Lyndon B. Johnson on July 4, 1966.

References

Further reading

External links
John E. Moss Foundation web site

Democratic Party members of the United States House of Representatives from California
1915 births
1997 deaths
Democratic Party members of the California State Assembly
People from Carbon County, Utah
20th-century American politicians